Kadungooth is located in Koottilangadi Panchayath, Malappuram district, Perinthalmanna Taluk, Kerala, India. The area is surrounded by the river (ana kundu), two canals joining to this river (thode and eddara), hills and paddy fields. Road NH213 passes through the Kadungooth area. There is a small football ground. The neighboring places are Kachinikkadu, Keeramkundu, Paradi, Cheloor and Kuruva.

Demographics
Around 130 families reside here. Around 95% of the population is Muslim and 5% is Hindu. All religions are considered equal.

Economy
The main revenue of the area is from the Gulf money. One or two members of most families work in the Gulf. Most of them work in small business, as laborers, or as government employees.

References

Suburbs of Malappuram